Standard Army Maintenance System-Enhanced (SAMS-E) SAMS-E is a United States Army Logistics Information System considered a mission critical system. It supports Combat Services Support (CSS) Table of Organization and Equipment (TO&E) unit level maintenance elements, Field and Sustainment maintenance shop production activities, and Maintenance managers from the battalion to wholesale levels. SAMS-E was created by MAT after receiving the initial Army contract in 2004McLane Advanced Technologies (MAT) in Temple, Texas. On February 12, 2012 MAT announced the successful release of version 13.01.06 for SAMS-E.

History:

SAMS-E was developed by MAT after being awarded the initial contract in 2004 for modernizing the army's various computer programs (ULLS-G, SAMS-1, SAMS-2, and SAMS I/TDA).  McLane also received follow-on contracts in 2006 and 2010 for product development.  These two contracts totaled $143M.

Technical Characteristics
 Operating Systems: Windows 7 and Windows Server
 Database: Oracle
 Languages: C#, Visual Studio.NET
 Hardware: COTS notebooks, host, printer and AIT equipment (handheld device, wireless access point, encoder/decoder)

Applications
SAMS-E consists of SAMS-1E and SAMS-2E. Although not part of the SAMS they communicate with the SARSS system. It replaces and enhances the ULLS-G (Unit Level Logistics-Ground), SAMS-1 and SAMS-2 legacy systems by:

 incorporating the Windows graphical user interface
 integrating the Windows operating system
 merging functionality of ULLS-G into SAMS-1.

This effort was a maintenance systems modernization initiative which allowed SAMS-E to act as a bridge between current functionality and future systems. SAMS-E modernizes the following functions:

Automated unit level maintenance, supply, and readiness reporting functions
Day-to-day weapon system and sub-component readiness status
Maintenance and related repair parts information
Management functions from the tactical direct support (DS)/general support (GS) level maintenance activities and supports the transition to the Field and Sustainment Maintenance concept (Two-Levels of Maintenance)

SAMS-E will be replaced by the Global Combat Support System-Army.

Variants
 McLane Maintenance Management System (MMS)-MMS is a commercial fleet management software program that builds upon's MAT's knowledge gained in developing similar products for large customers like the US Army.

See also
Computerized maintenance management system
Global Command and Control System

References 

Military communications
Military equipment of the United States
Military logistics of the United States
Military maintenance